is a Japanese yuri romance manga series written and illustrated by Akiko Morishima. It was serialized in Comic Yuri Hime by Ichijinsha, with the chapters collected in two volumes. It was released online in English by JManga and it is published in French by Taïfu Comics.

Characters
Yae Sakura, second-year student
Chitose Hayami, second-year
Ran Edogawa, English teacher
Mari Hanashima, third-year who pursues Ran

Reception
Two of the staff at Manga Sanctuary gave it an averaged rating of 6.5 out of 10. On AnimeLand, the staff gave both volumes a rating of "interesting". Erica Friedman gave both volumes an overall rating of 9 and said it "turned out to be a pretty interesting series".

References

External links

Ichijinsha manga
Lesbian-related comics
Romance anime and manga
Yuri (genre) anime and manga